Emirhacı  is a small village in Gülnar district of Mersin Province, Turkey. The population of the village was 64 as of 2012. Emirhacı was a part of Beydili village up to 1953 when it was declared a village. The ancient (Luvian) castle Meydancık is situated to the west of the village.

References

Villages in Gülnar District